Arthonia is a genus of lichens in the family Arthoniaceae. It was circumscribed by Swedish botanist Erik Acharius in 1806.

It is a genus of thin crustose lichen of widely varying forms, commonly called comma lichens.

Gallery

Species

 Arthonia abbreviata Müll. Arg., 1895
 Arthonia abnormis (Ach.) Müll. Arg., 1880
 Arthonia abrothallina Nyl., 1856
 Arthonia accolens Stirt., 1878
 Arthonia acharii A. Massal., 1860.
 Arthonia aciniformis Stirt., 1878
 Arthonia adhaerens Müll. Arg., 1880
 Arthonia adspera (Mont.) Kremp., 1878
 Arthonia affinis (A. Massal.) Jatta, 1900
 Arthonia aggregata Alstrup, M.S. Christ. & Hafellner, 1993
 Arthonia alba Müll. Arg., 1894
 Arthonia albatula (Müll. Arg.) Willey, 1890
 Arthonia albida C. Knight, 1860
 Arthonia albinula Nyl., 1886
 Arthonia albofarinosa Stirt., 1899
 Arthonia albofuscescens 
 Arthonia albonigra 
 Arthonia albopulverea 
 Arthonia alborufella 
 Arthonia albovirens 
 Arthonia albovirescens 
 Arthonia aleta 
 Arthonia aleuromela 
 Arthonia alexandrina 
 Arthonia algarbica 
 Arthonia almquistii 
 Arthonia ambiguella 
 Arthonia amboinensis 
 Arthonia americana 
 Arthonia amoena 
 Arthonia amylospora 
 Arthonia analogella 
 Arthonia anegadensis 
 Arthonia anglica 
 Arthonia angulata 
 Arthonia angulosa 
 Arthonia anisolocularis 
 Arthonia anjutii 
 Arthonia anombrophila 
 Arthonia antillarum 
 Arthonia apatetica 
 Arthonia aphanocarpa 
 Arthonia aphthoides 
 Arthonia aphthosa 
 Arthonia apotheciorum 
 Arthonia applanata 
 Arthonia apteropteridis 
 Arthonia aquatica 
 Arthonia aquilina 
 Arthonia araucariae 
 Arthonia arctata 
 Arthonia argentea 
 Arthonia armoricana 
 Arthonia arnoldii 
 Arthonia arthoniicola 
 Arthonia arthonioides 
 Arthonia aspera 
 Arthonia aspiciliae 
 Arthonia asteriscus 
 Arthonia asteroma 
 Arthonia astrica 
 Arthonia astroidestera 
 Arthonia astropica 
 Arthonia atacamensis 
 Arthonia athroa 
 Arthonia atlantica 
 Arthonia atomaria 
 Arthonia atra 
 Arthonia atrata 
 Arthonia atropallida 
 Arthonia atropunctata 
 Arthonia atrorufa 
 Arthonia auracariae 
 Arthonia aurantiaca 
 Arthonia austinii 
 Arthonia australis 
 Arthonia austrolitoralis 
 Arthonia ayseniae 
 Arthonia bacidiospora 
 Arthonia badia 
 Arthonia baeaophaea 
 Arthonia baeastroidea 
 Arthonia bambusicola 
 Arthonia banksiae 
 Arthonia bassanensis 
 Arthonia beccariana 
 Arthonia beltraminiana 
 Arthonia berberina 
 Arthonia bessalis 
 Arthonia betuleti 
 Arthonia betulicola 
 Arthonia biatoricola 
 Arthonia biformis 
 Arthonia bisepta 
 Arthonia biseptata 
 Arthonia biseptella 
 Arthonia bombacina 
 Arthonia boreella 
 Arthonia brouardii 
 Arthonia brucei 
 Arthonia brussei 
 Arthonia bueriana 
 Arthonia byssacea 
 Arthonia caerulescens 
 Arthonia caesia 
 Arthonia caesiella 
 Arthonia caesioalba 
 Arthonia caesiolivens 
 Arthonia calabrella 
 Arthonia calcarea 
 Arthonia calcicola 
 Arthonia calospora 
 Arthonia capensis 
 Arthonia caribaea 
 Arthonia carneoalbens 
 Arthonia carneorufa 
 Arthonia carneoumbrina 
 Arthonia cascarillae 
 Arthonia castanea 
 Arthonia catenatula 
 Arthonia catillaria 
 Arthonia caudata 
 Arthonia celtidicola 
 Arthonia celtidis 
 Arthonia ceracea 
 Arthonia cerei 
 Arthonia chilensis 
 Arthonia chiodectella 
 Arthonia chroolepida 
 Arthonia cinchonae 
 Arthonia cinerascens 
 Arthonia cinereopruinosa 
 Arthonia cinnabarina 
 Arthonia cinnabarinula 
 Arthonia cinnamomea 
 Arthonia circinata 
 Arthonia circumalbicans 
 Arthonia circumscissa 
 Arthonia circumtincta 
 Arthonia clauzadei 
 Arthonia clemens 
 Arthonia cocoës 
 Arthonia cohabitans 
 Arthonia collectiva 
 Arthonia collospora 
 Arthonia colombiana 
 Arthonia commutata 
 Arthonia compensatula 
 Arthonia complanata 
 Arthonia complanatula 
 Arthonia concava 
 Arthonia conferta 
 Arthonia confinis 
 Arthonia confluens 
 Arthonia coniangioides 
 Arthonia consanguinea 
 Arthonia consimilis 
 Arthonia conspersula 
 Arthonia conturbata 
 Arthonia convexella 
 Arthonia copromya 
 Arthonia coquimbensis 
 Arthonia corallifera 
 Arthonia cordiae 
 Arthonia coriifoliae 
 Arthonia coronata 
 Arthonia costaricensis 
 Arthonia cretacea 
 Arthonia crozalsiana 
 Arthonia crustacea 
 Arthonia cryptotheciae 
 Arthonia crystallifera 
 Arthonia culmicola 
 Arthonia cupressina 
 Arthonia curreyi 
 Arthonia cyanea 
 Arthonia cyrtodes 
 Arthonia cytisi 
 Arthonia dalmatica 
 Arthonia dalmaticola 
 Arthonia darbishirei 
 Arthonia decemlocularis 
 Arthonia decussata 
 Arthonia delicatula 
 Arthonia dendritella 
 Arthonia depressula 
 Arthonia destruens 
 Arthonia diaphora 
 Arthonia dichotoma 
 Arthonia dictyophora 
 Arthonia didyma 
 Arthonia difformis 
 Arthonia diffusa 
 Arthonia diffusella 
 Arthonia digitatae 
 Arthonia digitispora 
 Arthonia dilatata 
 Arthonia diluta 
 Arthonia diorygmae 
 Arthonia diploiciae 
 Arthonia diplotypa 
 Arthonia dispartibilis 
 Arthonia dispersa 
 Arthonia dispersella 
 Arthonia dispersula 
 Arthonia dispuncta 
 Arthonia distincta 
 Arthonia distinctior 
 Arthonia divergens 
 Arthonia dussii 
 Arthonia eckfeldtii 
 Arthonia ecrustacea 
 Arthonia ectropoma 
 Arthonia efflorescens 
 Arthonia effusa 
 Arthonia elabens 
 Arthonia elegans 
 Arthonia elevata 
 Arthonia elliottii 
 Arthonia emersea 
 Arthonia endlicheri 
 Arthonia endococcinea 
 Arthonia endoxantha 
 Arthonia ephelodes 
 Arthonia epicladonia 
 Arthonia epifarinosa 
 Arthonia epimela 
 Arthonia epiodes 
 Arthonia epipastoides 
 Arthonia epiphyscia 
 Arthonia epitoninia 
 Arthonia erubescens 
 Arthonia erupta 
 Arthonia erythrocarpa 
 Arthonia erythrogona 
 Arthonia esculenta 
 Arthonia excedens 
 Arthonia excentrica 
 Arthonia excipienda 
 Arthonia exilis 
 Arthonia explanata 
 Arthonia extensa 
 Arthonia extenuescens 
 Arthonia faginea 
 Arthonia falcata 
 Arthonia farinacea 
 Arthonia farinosa 
 Arthonia farinulenta 
 Arthonia ferruginea 
 Arthonia fissurina 
 Arthonia fissurinella 
 Arthonia flavicantis 
 Arthonia flavidosanguinea 
 Arthonia flavoverrucosa 
 Arthonia florida 
 Arthonia floridana 
 Arthonia follmanniana 
 Arthonia follmannii 
 Arthonia fomentaria 
 Arthonia fosteri 
 Arthonia foveolaris 
 Arthonia fuliginosa 
 Arthonia fusca 
 Arthonia fuscescens 
 Arthonia fuscoalbella 
 Arthonia fuscocinerea 
 Arthonia fuscocyanea 
 Arthonia fuscoglauca 
 Arthonia fusconigra 
 Arthonia fuscopallens 
 Arthonia fuscopurpurea 
 Arthonia fuscorufa 
 Arthonia fusispora 
 Arthonia galactiformis 
 Arthonia galactina 
 Arthonia galactitella 
 Arthonia galactites 
 Arthonia garajonayi 
 Arthonia gattefossei 
 Arthonia gelidae 
 Arthonia genuflexa 
 Arthonia gerhardii 
 Arthonia gibberulosa 
 Arthonia glabrata 
 Arthonia glacialis 
 Arthonia glaucella 
 Arthonia glaucescens 
 Arthonia glebosa 
 Arthonia glomerulosa 
 Arthonia gracilenta 
 Arthonia gracilior 
 Arthonia gracilis 
 Arthonia gracillima 
 Arthonia granosa 
 Arthonia granulosa 
 Arthonia graphidicola 
 Arthonia graphidis 
 Arthonia graphoides 
 Arthonia gregantula 
 Arthonia gregaria 
 Arthonia griseoalba 
 Arthonia grubei 
 Arthonia gyalectoides 
 Arthonia gyrosa 
 Arthonia haematommatum 
 Arthonia haematostigma 
 Arthonia hamamelidis 
 Arthonia hampeana 
 Arthonia hapaliza 
 Arthonia hawksworthii 
 Arthonia hazslinszkyi 
 Arthonia helvola 
 Arthonia henoniana 
 Arthonia hepatica 
 Arthonia herpetica 
 Arthonia hertelii 
 Arthonia heterella 
 Arthonia heteromorpha 
 Arthonia hioramii 
 Arthonia homoeophana 
 Arthonia horaria 
 Arthonia hormidiella 
 Arthonia hymenula 
 Arthonia hypobela 
 Arthonia hypochniza 
 Arthonia ilicina 
 Arthonia ilicinella 
 Arthonia ilicinodes 
 Arthonia immersa 
 Arthonia impallens 
 Arthonia impolitella 
 Arthonia incarnata 
 Arthonia inconspicua 
 Arthonia indistincta 
 Arthonia infectans 
 Arthonia ingaderiae 
 Arthonia insidiens 
 Arthonia insitiva 
 Arthonia insulata 
 Arthonia interducta 
 Arthonia intermedia 
 Arthonia interstes 
 Arthonia interveniens 
 Arthonia intexta 
 Arthonia invadens 
 Arthonia isidiata 
 Arthonia japewiae 
 Arthonia jobstiana 
 Arthonia kauaiensis 
 Arthonia kermesina 
 Arthonia knightii 
 Arthonia koerberi 
 Arthonia lacerata 
 Arthonia lactea 
 Arthonia lanuginosa 
 Arthonia lapidicola 
 Arthonia lecanactidea 
 Arthonia lecanorella 
 Arthonia lecanoriicola 
 Arthonia lecanorina 
 Arthonia lecanoroides 
 Arthonia lecideicarpa 
 Arthonia lecideoides 
 Arthonia lecideola 
 Arthonia lecythidicola 
 Arthonia leightonii 
 Arthonia leioplacella 
 Arthonia lepidiota 
 Arthonia lepidophila 
 Arthonia leprariella 
 Arthonia leptogramma 
 Arthonia leptogrammoides 
 Arthonia leptographidea 
 Arthonia leptosperma 
 Arthonia leptospora 
 Arthonia lethariicola 
 Arthonia leucastraea 
 Arthonia leucocarpa 
 Arthonia leucocheila 
 Arthonia leucographella 
 Arthonia leucoschisma 
 Arthonia ligniaria 
 Arthonia ligniariella 
 Arthonia lignicola 
 Arthonia lilacina 
 Arthonia limitata 
 Arthonia linearis 
 Arthonia lineola 
 Arthonia linitae 
 Arthonia lirellaeformis 
 Arthonia lividofusca 
 Arthonia lividorufa 
 Arthonia lividula 
 Arthonia loandensis 
 Arthonia loangana 
 Arthonia lobulata 
 Arthonia lobulocarpa 
 Arthonia lopingensis 
 Arthonia luridoalba 
 Arthonia luridofusca 
 Arthonia macgregorii 
 Arthonia macounii 
 Arthonia macrosperma 
 Arthonia macularis 
 Arthonia maculiformis 
 Arthonia madreana 
 Arthonia malayana 
 Arthonia malicola 
 Arthonia mangiferae 
 Arthonia marginalis 
 Arthonia marginata 
 Arthonia marginella 
 Arthonia marmorata 
 Arthonia mazosia 
 Arthonia mazosiae 
 Arthonia mazosiicola 
 Arthonia mediella 
 Arthonia medusula 
 Arthonia meissneri 
 Arthonia meizomorpha 
 Arthonia melaleucella 
 Arthonia melanophthalma 
 Arthonia melanopsis 
 Arthonia melanospila 
 Arthonia meridionalis 
 Arthonia mesoleuca 
 Arthonia micrastera 
 Arthonia microcarpa 
 Arthonia microcarpella 
 Arthonia microcephala 
 Arthonia microscopica 
 Arthonia microsperma 
 Arthonia microspermella 
 Arthonia microspermoides 
 Arthonia microsticta 
 Arthonia miltina 
 Arthonia minimum 
 Arthonia minuta 
 Arthonia minutella 
 Arthonia minutissima 
 Arthonia mira 
 Arthonia mirabilis 
 Arthonia miserula 
 Arthonia modesta 
 Arthonia molendoi 
 Arthonia moniliformis 
 Arthonia montagnei 
 Arthonia montellica 
 Arthonia muelleri 
 Arthonia multiformis 
 Arthonia muscigena 
 Arthonia mycoporodes 
 Arthonia mycoporoides 
 Arthonia myophaena 
 Arthonia myriadea 
 Arthonia myriocarpa 
 Arthonia myriocarpella 
 Arthonia myristicae 
 Arthonia nana 
 Arthonia nebulosa 
 Arthonia neglecta 
 Arthonia neglectula 
 Arthonia nemoralis 
 Arthonia neonii 
 Arthonia nephelina 
 Arthonia nephromiaria 
 Arthonia neuridella 
 Arthonia nideri 
 Arthonia nigerrima 
 Arthonia nigratula 
 Arthonia nigrocincta 
 Arthonia nigrorufa 
 Arthonia nivea 
 Arthonia noli-tangere 
 Arthonia novaecaledoniae 
 Arthonia novaeguineae 
 Arthonia novella 
 Arthonia nucis 
 Arthonia nudata 
 Arthonia nylanderi 
 Arthonia nymphaeoides 
 Arthonia oasis 
 Arthonia obducta 
 Arthonia obesa 
 Arthonia oblongula 
 Arthonia obscurata 
 Arthonia obscuratula 
 Arthonia obscurella 
 Arthonia obscurior 
 Arthonia obtusa 
 Arthonia obtusangula 
 Arthonia obtusula 
 Arthonia obvelata 
 Arthonia oceanica 
 Arthonia ochraceella 
 Arthonia ochrocincta 
 Arthonia ochrodes 
 Arthonia ochrodiscodes 
 Arthonia ochrolutea 
 Arthonia ochropallens 
 Arthonia ochrospila 
 Arthonia octolocularis 
 Arthonia oleandri 
 Arthonia oligospora 
 Arthonia olivacea 
 Arthonia onegensis 
 Arthonia opegraphina 
 Arthonia opegraphizans 
 Arthonia orbicularis 
 Arthonia orbignyae 
 Arthonia orchidicida 
 Arthonia oxyspora 
 Arthonia oxytera 
 Arthonia palmensis 
 Arthonia palmicola 
 Arthonia palmulacea 
 Arthonia pandanicola 
 Arthonia pantherina 
 Arthonia paradoxa 
 Arthonia paraffinis 
 Arthonia parallelata 
 Arthonia parallelula 
 Arthonia parantillarum 
 Arthonia parastroidea 
 Arthonia pardalis 
 Arthonia parmeliae 
 Arthonia patellula 
 Arthonia patellulata 
 Arthonia pauciseptata 
 Arthonia pellaea 
 Arthonia pellucida 
 Arthonia peltigerea 
 Arthonia peltigerina 
 Arthonia pelvetii 
 Arthonia peraffinis 
 Arthonia perangusta 
 Arthonia perminuta 
 Arthonia perpallens 
 Arthonia perparva 
 Arthonia perparvula 
 Arthonia perplexans 
 Arthonia pertabescens 
 Arthonia pertenera 
 Arthonia pertusariella 
 Arthonia petrensis 
 Arthonia phaeobaea 
 Arthonia phaeonephela 
 Arthonia phaeophysciae 
 Arthonia phaeosporella 
 Arthonia phlyctidicola 
 Arthonia phlyctiformis 
 Arthonia phyllogena 
 Arthonia phylloica 
 Arthonia phyllospiliza 
 Arthonia phymatodes 
 Arthonia physciae 
 Arthonia picea 
 Arthonia picila 
 Arthonia pinastri 
 Arthonia platygraphella 
 Arthonia platygraphidea 
 Arthonia platyspilea 
 Arthonia plectocarpoides 
 Arthonia plumbea 
 Arthonia plurilocularia 
 Arthonia pluriseptata 
 Arthonia pocsii 
 Arthonia polillensis 
 Arthonia polygramma 
 Arthonia polygrammodes 
 Arthonia polymorpha 
 Arthonia polymorphula 
 Arthonia polystigmatea 
 Arthonia populina 
 Arthonia pragensis 
 Arthonia prominens 
 Arthonia propinqua 
 Arthonia pruinascens 
 Arthonia pruinata 
 Arthonia pruinosella 
 Arthonia pruinosula 
 Arthonia pseudocyphellariae 
 Arthonia pseudopegraphina 
 Arthonia psimmythodes 
 Arthonia puiggarii 
 Arthonia pulicosa 
 Arthonia pulveracea 
 Arthonia punctella 
 Arthonia punctiformis 
 Arthonia punctilliformis 
 Arthonia purpurissata 
 Arthonia pyrenuloides 
 Arthonia pyrrhuliza 
 Arthonia quadriseptata 
 Arthonia quatuorseptata 
 Arthonia quercicola 
 Arthonia quercus 
 Arthonia quintaria 
 Arthonia radians 
 Arthonia radiata 
 Arthonia ramosii 
 Arthonia ramosula 
 Arthonia ramulosa 
 Arthonia ravenelii 
 Arthonia ravida 
 Arthonia recedens 
 Arthonia rechingeri 
 Arthonia redingeri 
 Arthonia reniformis 
 Arthonia reticulifera 
 Arthonia rhizophorae 
 Arthonia rhododendri 
 Arthonia rhoidis 
 Arthonia rimeliicola 
 Arthonia rinodinicola 
 Arthonia robinsonii 
 Arthonia rubella 
 Arthonia rubescens 
 Arthonia rubiginella 
 Arthonia rubra 
 Arthonia rubrocincta 
 Arthonia rubrofuscescens 
 Arthonia ruderalis 
 Arthonia ruderella 
 Arthonia rufella 
 Arthonia rufidula 
 Arthonia rugosa 
 Arthonia rugosula 
 Arthonia rugulosa 
 Arthonia rupicola 
 Arthonia sacromontana 
 Arthonia sagenidii 
 Arthonia salicicola 
 Arthonia sampaianae 
 Arthonia sandwicensis 
 Arthonia sanguinea 
 Arthonia santessoniana 
 Arthonia santessonii 
 Arthonia sapineti 
 Arthonia sardoa 
 Arthonia saxatilis 
 Arthonia saxorum 
 Arthonia scandinavica 
 Arthonia schaereri 
 Arthonia schopfiae 
 Arthonia schwartziana 
 Arthonia scitula 
 Arthonia semi-immersa 
 Arthonia septemlocularis 
 Arthonia septiseptata 
 Arthonia septiseptella 
 Arthonia serialis 
 Arthonia serograpta 
 Arthonia sexlocularis 
 Arthonia sherparum 
 Arthonia siderea 
 Arthonia simplicascens 
 Arthonia simplicata 
 Arthonia somaliensis 
 Arthonia sorbina 
 Arthonia sordaria 
 Arthonia sorsogona 
 Arthonia souliei 
 Arthonia spadicea 
 Arthonia speciosa 
 Arthonia sphaerula 
 Arthonia spyridii 
 Arthonia spilomatoides 
 Arthonia stellaris 
 Arthonia stenographella 
 Arthonia stenospora 
 Arthonia stereocaulina 
 Arthonia stictaria 
 Arthonia stictella 
 Arthonia stictica 
 Arthonia stictoides 
 Arthonia subaggregata 
 Arthonia subantarctica 
 Arthonia subastroidea 
 Arthonia subastroidella 
 Arthonia subbessalis 
 Arthonia subcaesia 
 Arthonia subcembrina 
 Arthonia subcondita 
 Arthonia subconveniens 
 Arthonia subdiffusa 
 Arthonia subdispersa 
 Arthonia subdispersula 
 Arthonia subdispuncta 
 Arthonia subexcedens 
 Arthonia subfuscicola 
 Arthonia subgracilis 
 Arthonia subgrisea 
 Arthonia subgyrosa 
 Arthonia subilicina 
 Arthonia subinvisibilis 
 Arthonia sublurida 
 Arthonia submersa 
 Arthonia subminutissima 
 Arthonia subminutula 
 Arthonia submiserula 
 Arthonia subnebulosa 
 Arthonia subnovella 
 Arthonia subpolymorpha 
 Arthonia subpruinosa 
 Arthonia subramulosa 
 Arthonia subrotunda 
 Arthonia subrubella 
 Arthonia subsimillima 
 Arthonia subspadicea 
 Arthonia substellata 
 Arthonia subtecta 
 Arthonia subtilissima 
 Arthonia subvaria 
 Arthonia subvelata 
 Arthonia subvelutina 
 Arthonia subvenosa 
 Arthonia suffusa 
 Arthonia sulphurea 
 Arthonia susa 
 Arthonia swartziana 
 Arthonia swartzii 
 Arthonia symmicta 
 Arthonia sytnikii 
 Arthonia tabescens 
 Arthonia tabidula 
 Arthonia taedescens 
 Arthonia taediosa 
 Arthonia taediosoides 
 Arthonia taediosula 
 Arthonia tasmanica 
 Arthonia tavaresii 
 Arthonia tehleri 
 Arthonia tenellula 
 Arthonia tenuissima 
 Arthonia terrigena 
 Arthonia tetramera 
 Arthonia tetraspora 
 Arthonia thamnocarpa 
 Arthonia thelotrematis 
 Arthonia thoracifera 
 Arthonia thozetiana 
 Arthonia tonduziana 
 Arthonia tongaensis 
 Arthonia torulosa 
 Arthonia trabinella 
 Arthonia trailii 
 Arthonia translucens 
 Arthonia treilii 
 Arthonia tremelloides 
 Arthonia tremellosa 
 Arthonia tremulans 
 Arthonia triebeliae 
 Arthonia trilocularis 
 Arthonia tuckermaniana 
 Arthonia tumidula 
 Arthonia turbatula 
 Arthonia turbidula 
 Arthonia turcica 
 Arthonia ulcerosula 
 Arthonia undenaria 
 Arthonia urceolata 
 Arthonia vagans 
 Arthonia varia 
 Arthonia variabilis 
 Arthonia varians 
 Arthonia variella 
 Arthonia variiformis 
 Arthonia variratae 
 Arthonia velata 
 Arthonia velleiformis 
 Arthonia vernans 
 Arthonia vernicis 
 Arthonia verrucarioides 
 Arthonia verrucosa 
 Arthonia verruculosa 
 Arthonia versicolor 
 Arthonia viburnea 
 Arthonia vinosa 
 Arthonia violacea 
 Arthonia viridicans 
 Arthonia voglii 
 Arthonia vorsoeensis 
 Arthonia wagneriana 
 Arthonia willeyi 
 Arthonia wrightii 
 Arthonia xanthocarpa 
 Arthonia xanthoparmeliarum 
 Arthonia xylogena 
 Arthonia xylographica 
 Arthonia xylographoides 
 Arthonia xylophila 
 Arthonia zwackhii

References

Arthoniaceae
Arthoniomycetes genera
Lichen genera
Taxa named by Erik Acharius
Taxa described in 1806